Eaglefield Place, also known as Eaglesfield-Hunt Farm and Western Eyrie Farm, is a historic home and farm bridge located in Van Buren Township, Clay County, Indiana. The house was built about 1855, and is a two-story, Greek Revival style frame dwelling with a gable roof.  Also on the property are a contributing American Craftsman style frame barn (c. 1895), chicken house, and shed.

It was added to the National Register of Historic Places in 1998.

References

Farms on the National Register of Historic Places in Indiana
Greek Revival houses in Indiana
Houses completed in 1855
Buildings and structures in Clay County, Indiana
National Register of Historic Places in Clay County, Indiana